The Nashville Vols were a Minor League Baseball team that played in Nashville, Tennessee, from 1901 to 1963. Known only as the Nashville Baseball Club during their first seven seasons, they were officially named the Nashville Volunteers (often shortened to Vols) in 1908 for the state's nickname, The Volunteer State. The Vols played their home games at Sulphur Dell, which was known as Athletic Park until 1908.

The Volunteers played as charter members of the Southern Association (SA) from 1901 to 1961. They were classified as Class B (1901), Class A (1902–1935), Class A1 (1936–1945), and Double-A (1946–1961). During their 61 seasons in the circuit, the Vols won eight SA pennants, nine SA playoff championships, and four Dixie Series championships. The 1940 Vols were recognized as one of the 100 greatest minor league teams of all time. After sitting out the 1962 season, the club returned for a final campaign as a part of the Double-A South Atlantic League in 1963.

Nashville served as a farm club for eight Major League Baseball franchises across 29 seasons and were unaffiliated in the other 33 seasons. A total of 26 managers led the club and its over 1,200 players. Through 62 seasons, the Vols played 9,015 regular season games and compiled a win–loss record of 4,569–4,446. They had a postseason record of 108–74. Combining all 9,197 regular season and postseason games, the Vols had an all-time record of 4,677–4,520.

History

Prior professional baseball in Nashville 

Nashville has hosted Minor League Baseball teams since the late 19th century. The city's professional baseball history dates back to 1884 with the formation of the Nashville Americans, who were charter members of the original Southern League from 1885 to 1886 and played their home games at Sulphur Spring Park, later renamed Athletic Park and Sulphur Dell. This ballpark was the home of Nashville's minor league teams through 1963. In 1887, Nashville's Southern League team was called the Nashville Blues. The Nashville Tigers competed for the city in the same league from 1893 to 1894. In 1895, the Nashville Seraphs won the city's first professional championship in the Southern League. The Nashville Centennials played in the Central League in 1897 but relocated to Henderson, Kentucky, during the season before the league's collapse.

Early days (1901–1933) 
After the city's three-year absence from professional baseball, the Nashville Baseball Club was formed in 1901 as a charter member of the Class B Southern Association. The team did not receive their official moniker, the Nashville Volunteers, until 1908. The Nashville club played their home games at Athletic Park (Sulphur Dell).

Before the start of the inaugural season, Nashville participated in a three-game exhibition series against the Vanderbilt Commodores baseball team. Nashville won all three games. The team began the regular season in Chattanooga, sweeping the Chattanooga Lookouts in three games, before returning home to Athletic Park for the home opener. The game's lineup, led by player-manager Ike Fisher, consisted of second baseman Ed Abbaticchio, right fielder Doc Wiseman, first baseman Ike Fisher, catcher James Ballantyne, center fielder Lang, left fielder Tom Parrott, third baseman George Reitz, shortstop Snapper Kennedy, and pitcher Ted Corbett. Over 2,000 people witnessed the 9–7 Nashville loss. By July 4, they were in second place (31–21), one game behind the Little Rock Travelers. By mid-August, Nashville had moved into first, leading the Memphis Egyptians by two games. Teams throughout the circuit expressed dissatisfaction with the league's umpires. After a number of games were protested and teams' records adjusted, the Nashville club was declared the Southern Association's first champions. The team repeated their success in 1902 by once again being declared league champions. The Nashville Club's final record was 82–42, six-and-a-half games ahead of Little Rock.

From 1903 to 1907, the Nashville club was unable to muster anything better than a fifth-place finish. 1904 was their only winning season and by 1907 the team was in last place. Still lacking an official team name, the club was referred to as the Finnites when Mickey Finn managed the team from 1905 to 1906, the Dobbers when John Dobbs managed the team in 1907, and the Senators, probably due to the nearby Tennessee State Capitol building which overlooked Athletic Park.

In 1908, Nashville Tennessean sports writer Grantland Rice held a contest to name the team. The public was invited to mail in votes for one of three team names: the Limerocks (from the abundance of limestone in and around Nashville), the Rocks, and the Volunteers (from the state's nickname, The Volunteer State). The winner and new official team name was the Volunteers, though this was often shortened to Vols. Rice also gave Nashville's Athletic Park a new name: Sulphur Dell, a reference to the location's prior name of Sulphur Springs Bottom.

The newly named Volunteers also became a farm team of the American League's Cleveland Naps in 1908. Nashville's John Duggan pitched a no-hitter on September 10, against Little Rock; Nashville won, 1–0. The club, under manager Bill Bernhard, entered the final day of that season with an opportunity to win the league pennant. The championship was to be decided by the last game of the season between the Vols and the New Orleans Pelicans at Sulphur Dell. Both teams had the same number of losses (56), but the Pelicans were in first place with 76 wins to the Vols' second-place 74. A crowd of 11,000 spectators witnessed Vols pitcher Carl Sitton hurl a three-hit, 1–0 shutout, giving Nashville their third Southern Association pennant by .002 percentage points. Rice called it "the greatest game ever played in Dixie." One account recalls "By one run, by one point, Nashville has won the Southern League pennant, nosing New Orleans out literally by an eyelash. Saturday's game, which was the deciding one, between Nashville and New Orleans was the greatest exhibition of the national game ever seen in the south and the finish in the league race probably sets a record in baseball history."

Before the start of the 1909 season, the National League's Chicago Cubs and American League's Boston Red Sox held their spring training in Nashville. The Volunteers held an exhibition game against the Cubs in which the visiting Cubs defeated the home team, 3–0. Nashville also participated in games against the Red Sox. They finished the regular 1909 season in second place behind the pennant-winning Atlanta Crackers. From 1910 through 1915, the Volunteers found themselves usually around the middle of the standings at the end of each season and only had winning records in 1911 and 1914. The 1913 Vols suffered a preseason defeat against the American League's Philadelphia Athletics, 11–8.

On July 11, 1916, at Sulphur Dell, Vols pitcher Tom Rogers delivered a perfect game against the Chattanooga Lookouts. He retired all 27 batters in the 2–0 victory—the first perfect game in the Southern Association and the only perfect game in the Volunteers' history. The game lasted a mere 1 hour and 25 minutes. Rogers led the league that season with 24 victories and 33 complete games. Under the leadership of manager Roy Ellam, the Vols went on to win their fourth league pennant with a nine-game lead over second-place New Orleans.

The Volunteers finished the 1910s with a winning (77–73) fifth-place record in 1917, and had sub-.500 seasons in 1918 and 1919 that placed them at or near the bottom of the standings. In 1920, Nashville served as a farm team for the American League's Chicago White Sox. The 1920s started out poorly for the Vols. The team didn't have a winning record for four seasons from 1920 to 1923. The National League's Pittsburgh Pirates purchased the contract of Vols outfielder Kiki Cuyler in 1923. Cuyler, who led the league with 68 stolen bases, was elected to the Baseball Hall of Fame in 1968. Things turned around as the team's record improved from 1924 to 1929—excluding 1928 when they finished in last place, 40 games out of first. They ended the decade only three games behind the pennant-winning Birmingham Barons in 1929.

The Volunteers played their first night game at Sulphur Dell on May 18, 1931, in front of an estimated 7,000 fans. However, this was not the first night game to be played at Nashville's ballpark. The original Southern League's Nashville Tigers competed in a night game thirty-seven years earlier on July 6, 1894. The Vols accrued over 100 losses in 1931, finishing in last place, 51–102.

In preparation for the 1932 season, the Vols defeated the Chicago White Sox, 8–4, in an exhibition game held on April 5. When the regular season began, 14,502 fans were in attendance. The outfield had to be lined off with rope to designate additional seating in order to accommodate them at the 8,000-seat Sulphur Dell. The Volunteers finished in fourth place (75–78) that season and third place (77–69) in 1933. Despite this record, they played in the newly created Southern Association championship playoff, in which they lost to the New Orleans Pelicans, 3–1.

Second half (1934–1963)

The Vols began a consistent period of affiliation with major league clubs in 1934. For that season and the next, they were a farm team for the New York Giants. They finished both campaigns with over-.500 records and played in the championship playoffs, but did not win titles. The Vols saw similar results in 1936 and 1937 as affiliates of the Cincinnati Reds: two winning seasons, a trip to the playoffs in 1936, but no championship.

From 1938 to 1940, the Vols were affiliated with the Brooklyn Dodgers. Under manager Chuck Dressen, the 1938 club finished in second place, five-and-a-half games behind the first-place Atlanta Crackers. Making to the Southern Association playoff finals, Nashville was defeated by the Crackers, 4–1–1. Manager Larry Gilbert, who would become the Vol's longest tenured and winningest manager in team history, came on to manage starting in 1939. The team finished in third place but went on to win the playoff championship against Atlanta. They lost in the Dixie Series, 4–3, to the Fort Worth Cats of the Texas League.

In a 2001 ranking, the 1940 Vols were ranked as the 47th greatest minor league team of all time. That team won the pennant with a franchise-high 101–47 (.682) record, having stayed in first place since day one of the season. After defeating Atlanta in the playoffs, Nashville won its first Dixie Series championship against the Houston Buffaloes, 4–1. Catcher Greek George was selected as the Southern Association Most Valuable Player (MVP) Award, an honor he shared with Atlanta's Emil Mailho. The Nashville club experience similar success in 1941 and 1942 as unaffiliated teams. Though finishing in second place, the Vols won the playoff championship and Dixie Series in both campaigns.

As Chicago Cubs affiliates, they won the pennant in 1943, and again won back-to-back playoffs in 1943 and 1944. In 1943, Ed Sauer was voted as the league MVP. The next two seasons were in stark contrast to the Vols' recent performances. The campaigns of 1945 and 1946 saw the team finish in seventh and sixth places, respectively. The next five seasons of affiliation with the Cubs resulted in winning seasons. The 1947 Vols lost in the playoff finals, as did the 1948 team that also won the pennant. Larry Gilbert did not return to the team in 1949. He left having guided the team to three Southern Association pennants, six playoff championships, and three-straight Dixie Series crowns. Rollie Hemsley managed the 1949 squad to a first-place pennant-winning season, an association championship, and a Dixie Series title. Chuck Workman was the league MVP in 1948, and teammate Carl Sawatski followed suit in 1949. Nashville closed out its time with the Cubs in 1950 and 1951, winning the playoffs in 1950 but losing the Dixie series and finishing in fifth place in 1951.

The Vols returned to the New York Giants organization from 1952 to 1954. They won the playoff championship in 1953, but lost in the Dixie Series, and finished the other two seasons with sub-.500 records in sixth place. During the 1954 season, outfielder Bob Lennon hit 64 home runs, a league record never broken. Forty of the home runs were hit at Sulphur Dell. Lennon led the Southern Association in a total of five categories that year (batting average, hits, runs, RBI, and home runs) and was awarded the Southern Association MVP Award.

Nashville's six years as a Cincinnati Redlegs/Reds affiliate from 1955 to 1960 featured little of the success they had experienced during the previous 20 years. Aside from winning the 1957 championship semi-finals versus the Memphis Chicks, 4–2, but losing to Atlanta in the finals, the Vols finished no higher than third place with records hovering around .500.

The refusal of the Southern Association to integrate its teams resulted in poor attendance in Nashville and across the league from 1946, when organized baseball was integrated. Plagued by poor attendance and financial woes, in January 1959 the franchise was sold to a group of local businessmen, which included county musician Eddy Arnold and politician and Tennessee Secretary of State Joe C. Carr. Known as Vols, Inc., the group was headed by president Herschel Lynn Greer. The corporation sold $5 shares to 4,876 investors to keep the team in operation.

In 1961, with the Minnesota Twins, the Vols went 69–83 (.454) with a sixth-place finish. The Southern Association ceased operations after the 1961 season due to low fan interest, financial losses, and the difficulty of fielding enough teams.

After Sulphur Dell sat empty in 1962 when no professional baseball was played in the city, Nashville fielded a team in the Double-A South Atlantic League in 1963. As an affiliate of the Los Angeles Angels, the Vols finished in last place out of eight teams with a 53–86 (.381) record. The Nashville Vols played their final games, in a doubleheader, on September 8, 1963, against the Lynchburg White Sox. Nashville won both games, 6–3 and 2–1. Poor attendance and financial problems, including a nearly $22,000 debt incurred over the season, forced team owners to surrender the franchise to the league just one week after the season's end.

Music City was without a professional baseball team for 14 years until 1978 when Vanderbilt University baseball coach Larry Schmittou led a group of local investors to found the Nashville Sounds, an expansion franchise of the Double-A Southern League, which grew out of the South Atlantic League.

Season-by-season results

Over 9,015 regular season games in their 62-year history, the Vols compiled a win–loss record of 4,569–4,446 (.507). They qualified for postseason playoffs on 16 occasions and had a postseason record of 108–74 (.593). Nashville won eight Southern Association (SA) pennants, nine SA playoff championships, and four Dixie Series titles. Combining all 9,197 regular season and postseason games, the Vols had an all-time record of 4,677–4,520 (.509). The team's best season record occurred in 1940 when they finished 101–47 (.682). Their lowest season record was 45–92 (.328) in 1906. Of the eight major league affiliations in Nashville's history, the team recorded its best record from 1938 to 1940 as a Brooklyn Dodgers affiliate. The team had a regular season record of 270–181 (.599) during that time. They reached the postseason in all three seasons, winning two playoff championships and one Dixie Series title. Their postseason record was 25–16 (.610). Conversely, the team's lowest record was as a Los Angeles Angels affiliate in 1963. The Vols compiled a 53–86 (.381) record and failed to reach the postseason in their lone year with the Angles and their final year of competition. Nashville's top five seasons by winning percentage are presented below.

Players 

After 62 seasons, over 1,200 players had competed in at least one game for the Vols. From these, Nashville Banner sportswriters Fred Russell and George Leonard created all-time rosters of the top Nashville players from 1901 to 1919 and from 1920 to 1963.

1901–1919

1920–1963

Achievements

Awards 

Eight Vols were selected for the Southern Association Most Valuable Player Award, more than any other team in the league, in recognition for their performance while with the Vols. These players were Greek George (1940), Ed Sauer (1943), Chuck Workman (1948), Carl Sawatski (1949), Bob Schultz (1950), Jack Harshman (1953), Bob Lennon (1954), and Stan Palys (1957).

Hall of Famers 
Two members of the Vols have been elected to the National Baseball Hall of Fame. Outfielder Kiki Cuyler, who was selected by the Veterans Committee in 1968, played for the Vols in 1923. In 149 games, Cuyler led the team with a .340 batting average, 195 hits, 39 doubles, and 17 triples. Waite Hoyt, who pitched for the team in 1918, was selected by the Veterans Committee in 1969.

Managers 

Over the course of 62 seasons, the Nashville Vols were led by 26 managers. Playing in an era when it was common to have player-managers, 17 men served as managers concurrent with their on-field playing. The team's eight regular season pennants, nine playoff championships, and four Dixie Series titles were won behind seven different managers. Newt Fisher (1901 and 1902), Bill Bernhard (1908), Roy Ellam (1916), and Larry Gilbert (1940, 1943, 1948, and 1949) managed the Vols to win the Southern Association pennant. Gilbert (1939, 1940, 1941, 1942, 1943, and 1944), Rollie Hemsley (1949), Don Osborn (1950), and Hugh Poland (1953) led the team to win SA playoff championships. Gilbert (1940, 1941, and 1942) and Hemsley (1949) managed Nashville to win the Dixie Series, a best-of-seven playoff series against the champions of the Texas League.

References
Specific

General

External links

Statistics from Baseball-Reference
Statistics from Stats Crew

 
1901 establishments in Tennessee
1963 disestablishments in Tennessee
Baseball teams established in 1901
Baseball teams disestablished in 1963
Brooklyn Dodgers minor league affiliates
Chicago Cubs minor league affiliates
Chicago White Sox minor league affiliates
Cincinnati Reds minor league affiliates
Cleveland Guardians minor league affiliates
Defunct baseball teams in Tennessee
Defunct Southern Association teams
Los Angeles Angels minor league affiliates
Minnesota Twins minor league affiliates
New York Giants minor league affiliates
South Atlantic League (1904–1963) teams
Sports in Nashville, Tennessee